Group Captain Allan Richard Wright,  (12 February 1920 – 16 September 2015) was a Royal Air Force (RAF) fighter pilot and flying ace of the Second World War. Wright scored 11 kills, three shared kills, five probable kills and seven damaged against the German Luftwaffe, and was one of the last surviving airmen called The Few who served in the Battle of Britain.

Early life
Wright was born in Devon on 12 February 1920. His father had been in the Royal Flying Corps from 1916 and retired from the RAF in 1943. Wright entered Royal Air Force College Cranwell as a flight cadet in April 1938.

RAF career
After training Wright was posted to No. 92 Squadron RAF at RAF Tangmere on 29 October 1939 flying Bristol Blenheim night fighters. On 8 March 1940, the squadron converted to Spitfires. Wright flew his first combat mission on 23 May 1940 over Dunkirk and claimed a probable Messerschmitt Bf 110 destroyed and two damaged. The following day Wright added one confirmed Bf 110 and one 'probable' Bf 110 and on 2 June a Messerschmitt Bf 109.

During the Battle of Britain he shared a Heinkel He 111 destroyed on 14 August, a Heinkel He 111 of Kampfgeschwader 27 (KG 27) at night over Bristol on 29 August, a Heinkel He 111 and Messerschmitt Bf 109 'probable' on 11 September, a Messerschmitt Bf 109 damaged on the 14th, a Messerschmitt Bf 109 'probable' on the 15th, a Junkers Ju 88 'probable' on the 19th, a Dornier Do 17 on the 26th, a Junkers Ju 88 on the 27th, and two Messerschmitt Bf 109's on the 30th. On 30 September he was shot down and wounded near Brighton by a Messerschmitt Bf 109 of Jagdgeschwader 27 (JG 27) and hospitalised. He was awarded the Distinguished Flying Cross (DFC) on 22 October 1940. The citation read:

On 6 December 1940 Wright destroyed a Messerschmitt Bf 109. By July 1941 Wright had received a Bar to his DFC. He was posted to No. 59 Operational Training Unit in July 1941. Service with RAF Fighter Command HQ and as an instructor followed until being posted to No. 29 Squadron RAF at RAF West Malling in March 1943, where as a night fighter he had his last confirmed kill – a Junkers Ju 88 on 3 April.

For the remainder of the war, Wright worked on training and fighter tactics. He became chief instructor at the Pilot Gunnery Instructor Wing of the Central Gunnery School, and later commanded the Air Fighting Development Unit at RAF Wittering. In early 1945, Wright was transferred to RAF El Bellah in Egypt where commanded the fighter wing of the Middle East Advanced Bombing and Gunnery School.

Remaining in the RAF post-war, he retired as a group captain on 12 February 1967.

Later Life 
In 1999, Wright attended a Time Team excavation in Wierre-Effroy in France. The episode focused on excavating a Mark 1 Spitfire (P9373) as flown by fellow 92 Squadron pilot Paul Klipsch. On the arrival of the aircraft into the squadron in 1940, Wright was the first pilot to fly it to ensure everything was correct.

References

1920 births
2015 deaths
Royal Air Force group captains
Royal Air Force pilots of World War II
British World War II flying aces
Recipients of the Distinguished Flying Cross (United Kingdom)
Recipients of the Air Force Cross (United Kingdom)
World War II
The Few
Graduates of the Royal Air Force College Cranwell
People from Teignmouth
Recipients of the Commendation for Valuable Service in the Air
Military personnel from Devon